WYQQ (90.1 FM; "The Q") is a radio station broadcasting a Christian CHR format. Licensed to Charlton, Massachusetts, United States, the station serves Southern Worcester County. The station is owned by Epic Light Network, Inc.

The station signed on in 1976 as WBPV, the high school radio station at Bay Path Regional Vocational Technical High School. It became WYCM when Christian Mix Radio bought the station in 2003 and introduced a contemporary Christian music format. On October 20, 2012, the station changed its call sign to the current WYQQ, when Epic Light purchased the station. WYQQ went on the air as "The Q 90.1 FM" in December 2012.

References

External links

YQQ
Radio stations established in 1976
Mass media in Worcester County, Massachusetts
1976 establishments in Massachusetts